The Albanian Wikipedia is the Albanian language edition of Wikipedia started on October 12, 2003.

Article growth

References 

 Shekulli. Ta shpëtojmë Wikipedian Shqipe. Die, 12 Gus 2007 08:57:00. Nga Ardian Vehbiu, Archived at the Internet Archive
  Tirana Observer. 15 shtetet që dikur ishin Bashkimi Sovjetik.  Shkruar nga Blendina Cara    e premte, 03 gusht 2007
 Tirana Observer. Epoka e Informacionit, e Skepticizmit dhe e Verifikimit. By Fatos TARIFA, PhD, Archived at the Internet Archive

External links

 Albanian Wikipedia
  Albanian Wikipedia mobile version

Wikipedias by language
Wikipedia
Internet properties established in 2003
Albanian encyclopedias